The Ministerial and other Maternity Allowances Act 2021 is an Act of Parliament that allows ministers and paid opposition figures to take up to six months maternity leave at full pay.

History
It was announced on 4 February 2021 that the government was going to update the law to allow Attorney General Suella Braverman, who was expecting her second child, to take six months of maternity leave.

The Act received royal assent on 1 March 2021. It was passed as introduced, except for that the gender-neutral "person" was replaced with "mother" or "mother or expectant mother", after some MPs and lords complained.

Adoption, shared parental leave, longer-term sickness absence, unpaid ministerial roles and the position of backbench MPs were all set to be revisited before the summer recess in 2021.

Mechanism 
The Act creates a discretionary power for the Prime Minister and the Leaders of the Opposition in the House of Commons and House of Lords to grant certain office holders six months maternity leave at full pay.

In the case of ministers, the Prime Minister may designate that person a Minister on Leave, an office which comes with the salary of that person's previous office (or current office if reshuffled) for up to six months. Another person may then be appointed to the Minister on Leave's previous office.

In the case of opposition figures, the Act allows an additional person to be appointed to a paid opposition office for up to six months.

Alternatives 
Ministers have no rights of maternity leave, as their status and constitutional position means that they are not treated as workers or employees.

Members of Parliament 
The Act does not extend to MPs, for which it has been criticised; backbench MPs are able to take informal maternity leave, but not all of their duties are covered during their absence. The first "locum MP" job, to cover constituency work but not sit or vote in the House of Commons, was advertised in 2019.

Ministers 
The Ministerial Code also states that:Ministers who wish to take maternity leave (of up to 6 months), or other extended absence from Government, must seek the permission of the Prime Minister. Where the Prime Minister agrees to such a request, the Minister must not exercise their functions as a Minister during their period of absence unless this is agreed by the Permanent Secretary and the Minister who is temporarily covering the Ministerial responsibilities.Several ministers have taken maternity leave, as early as in 2001. However, the rationale behind the Act is that the caps on salaries and the number of ministers limits the capacity to create covering posts. It is also said that the nature of Cabinet minister and Law Officer offices means that they could not take advantage of the route previously available to ministers.

Criticisms 
The Act has been criticised by Stella Creasy for not extending to all MPs. It has also been pointed out by Wendy Chamberlain that locum provisions are not yet available for male MPs on paternity leave. Additionally, Yvette Cooper has argued that the Act does not include any provisions for male ministers to take longer paternity leave.

James Hand says that the House of Commons spent four hours over the bill, with significant time being devoted to the question of using gender neutral language. He also points out that the Act does not provide a right for ministers to take maternity leave (but it remains at the discretion of the Prime Minister) and that, under the Act, the minister has to technically vacate their office, contrary to the concept of maternity keeping-in-touch days, though as members of the Government they can continue to be briefed. Finally, Hand says that the Act gives no guarantee that the Minister on Leave would revert to their original position when they return, concluding "[t]his rushed provision, with its partial and in some ways retrogressive approach to maternity leave (in forcing the minister to leave their post), is attributable to the Attorney-General being set to take maternity leave within a month."

List of Ministers on Leave

References

2021 in British law
2021 in British politics
Parental leave in the United Kingdom
Maternity in the United Kingdom
United Kingdom Acts of Parliament 2021